Events from the 11th century in Ireland.

1000s
1002
Máel Sechnaill mac Domnaill, without a battle, yields to Brian Boru, King of Munster who, effectively becomes King of Ireland and reigns until his death in 1014.
Brian Boru makes an expedition to the north to take hostages from the northern states.

1005
Brian Boru makes a second expedition to the north to take hostages from the northern states: during this expedition, he visited Armagh, making an offering of twenty ounces of gold to the church and confirming to the apostolic see of Saint Patrick, ecclesiastical supremacy over the whole of Ireland (as recorded in the Book of Armagh).
Death of Mael Ruanaidh Ua Dubhda, King of Uí Fiachrach Muaidhe.

1006
Brian Boru makes a triumphal progress around Leath Cuinn, taking hostages from every northern state, thus demonstrating he was undisputed King of Ireland.
Death of Cú Connacht mac Dundach.

1007
The Book of Kells is probably stolen from the Abbey of Kells in County Meath for several months.

1008
Gadhra Mór mac Dundach became chief of Síol Anmchadha.
Death of Madudan mac Gadhra Mór.

1010s
1012
King of Leinster, Máel Mórda mac Murchada, rises in revolt against High King Brian Boru.

1013
Brian Boru campaigned against the Vikings of Dublin under their King Sigtrygg Silkbeard and North Leinster led by Máel Mórda Mac Murchada, following attacks by them on Brian's ally Máel Sechnaill mac Domnaill.

1014
23 April: Battle of Clontarf, at which the Vikings and men of North Leinster are defeated by Brian Boru, who is killed in the battle as is Máel Mórda mac Murchada.

1015
Gadhra Mór mac Dundach becomes chief of Uí Maine

1016
Niall mac Eochada becomes king of Ulaid

1017
 Death of Cass Midhe, Irish lawyer

1020s
1021
 Death of Mac Cú Ceanain, King of Uí Díarmata.

1022
 Niall mac Eochada defeats the Dublin Norse at sea. 
 Death of Mael Seachnaill II, Overking of the Uí Néill, who had reigned since 980, and who became King of Ireland on the death of Brian Boru in 1014 and ruled until his death.

1023
Death of Tadc mac Briain, son of Brian Boru

1024 and 1026
 Niall mac Eochada invades Dublin and take hostages.

1027
 Death of Gadhra Mór mac Dundach, King of Síol Anmchadha and Uí Maine.

1030s
1030
Death of Gormflaith (b. 960), daughter of Murchad mac Find, King of Leinster, and third wife of Brian Ború.

1035
 Ragnall ua Ímair, King of Waterford slain by Sigtrygg Silkbeard.

1036
Sigtrygg Silkbeard driven out of Dublin by Echmarcach mac Ragnaill.

1038
First cathedral built in Dublin
Echmarcach mac Ragnaill driven out of Dublin by Ímar mac Arailt, who then reigns as king.

1040s
1041 
Death of Mac Beathaidh mac Ainmire, poet and Chief Ollam of Ireland.
1042
Death of Sigtrygg Silkbeard.

1046
Ímar mac Arailt was expelled from Dublin by Echmarcach mac Ragnaill, who then reigns as king.

1050s
1052
 Echmarcach mac Ragnaill, King of Dublin is expelled from the town.
1054
30 April: A tornado hits Ros-deala (in modern County Westmeath)

1060s
1064
Donnchad, son of Brian Boru, dies in Rome, after being dethroned by his nephew.

1069
Madudan Reamhar Ua Madadhan became Chief of Síol Anmchadha

1070s
1070
 Death of Murchad mac Diarmata, a king of Leinster and Dublin, a son of Diarmait mac Mail na mBo.

1072
 Death of Diarmait mac Mail na mBo, a king of Leinster and a contender for the title of High King of Ireland. He was one of the most important and significant Kings in Ireland in the pre-Norman era.

1075
 In a campaign against the Uí Néill and their allies in the north, Muirchertach Ua Briain (son of Toirdelbach) is defeated by the Airgíalla near Áth Fhirdia (modern Ardee, County Louth) with heavy loss.

1079
 Five Jews come from "over the sea" bringing gifts to Toirdelbach Ua Briain, King of Munster.

1080s
1080
Birth of Saint Ceallach (Celsus), (d 1129), future abbot of Armagh. He will preside at the synod of Rathbreasail in 1111.

1081
Gruffudd ap Cynan, Irish-born claimant to the Kingdom of Gwynedd, sails from Waterford to St David's with an army of Hiberno-Normans to enforce his claim.

1086
Muirchertach Ua Briain becomes King of Munster and claimant to the Kingship of Ireland, and reigns until 1119.

1088
Birth of Tairrdelbach Ua Conchobair, King of Connacht and High King of Ireland (d. 1156).

1090s
1095; 
Death of Madudan Reamhar Ua Madadhan, Chief of Síol Anmchadha
Birth of Saint Malachy (Middle Irish: Máel Máedóc Ua Morgair; Modern Irish: Maelmhaedhoc Ó Morgair)

1096
 is consecrated the first Bishop of Waterford by Saint Anselm of Canterbury.

References